Sheikh Muhammad-Hasan Abi al-Mahasin al-Janaji al-Ha'eri (1875–1923) was an Iraqi poet and politician. He was most famous for his participation in the Iraqi revolt of 1920.

Early life and family
Abi al-Mahasin, was born in Karbala in 1874. His grandfather, Muhsin al-Maliki, was the first of the family to migrate from Janaja, Hilla to Karbala, residing in Janaja, al-Hindiya in the end of the 19th century. They also gained stature in the city, after marrying into the Nasrallah family. He is of the Albu Muhsin family of Al-Ghati offshoot of Al-Ali tribe, a branch of Bani Malik tribe.

Biography 
Abi al-Mahasin was one of the leaders of the Iraqi revolution against the British occupation during and after the First World War. He became Mirza Taqi al-Shirazi's representative, by leading the Revolutionary Council (known as) in 1920. 

He later became the Minister of Education in the first national government of the royal reign of King Faisal I after Iraq's independence in 1922.

Works 
Abi al-Mahasin was a renowned poet, and his student Sheikh Muhammad-Ali al-Yaqubi published his diwan for him in 1966, under the name .

Abi al-Mahasin wrote a lot of poetry on pan-Arabism, and the glory of the Arabs, and one of his famous lines includes:

Personal life 
Abi al-Mahasin was married to the daughter of Sayyid Ali Nasrallah. He had six sons, Kamil, Muhammad-Husayn, Fadhil, Muhammad-Sharif, Abd al-Razzaq, and Mo'ein. 

His grandson, Nouri al-Maliki, was the prime minister of Iraq from 2006 until 2014.

See also
 Mirza Taqi al-Shirazi
 Nouri al-Maliki

References

Government ministers of Iraq
20th-century Iraqi poets
1876 births
1925 deaths
19th-century poets of Ottoman Iraq
Iraqi revolt of 1920